The Catalan Central Depression is a natural depression between the Pre-Pyrenees and the Catalan Pre-Coastal Range in Spain. It widens towards the west, linking with the Ebro Depression, of which it could be considered an eastern extension.  The Catalan Central Depression is about 180 km long with an average width of 50 km.

Description
The Catalan Central Depression consists of a succession of high plateaus between 800 and 1,000 metres in altitude that gradually lose height westwards until the Ebro Depression. There are eroded river basins limiting these heights wherever the ground is made up of clay or marlstone. The Pla de Bages and the Conca de Barberà are examples of these higher regions.

The limits of the Central Depression are different whether considered from the point of view of their origin or their actual relief. Some mountain ranges outside of the depression, like Montserrat and Sant Llorenç del Munt, are formed by the same geologic materials that make up the Central Depression, even though geographically they are situated in the Pre-Coastal Range. These materials were piled up over the more ancient rocks of the Catalan Mediterranean System.

The Central Depression formed in the Tertiary, when a great gulf, that later became a sea, had its boundaries in the Pyrenees and the Catalan-Balearic Massif.
Marine sedimentation formed clay, and other limestone materials, like bluish marl where the sedimentation had been part of a quiet and slow process, as well as conglomerate in the areas of the mouths of ancient rivers coming down from the Pyrenees and the former Catalan-Balearic Massif. Evaporation produced sodium and potassium salts, as well as gypsum in certain areas.

Mountain ranges
Some minor mountain ranges are scattered within the Central Depression without a regular pattern. The main ones are:
Serrat Gran de Postius
Serrat de la Minyona
Serrat de la Rodoreda
Serra de Castelltallat
Serra de Pinós
Serra de Brufaganya
Serra de Palomes
Serra de Rubió
Serra d'Almenara
Serra de Sant Miquel
Punta d'Ossós
Muntanya de Sant Mamet
Mont-Roig
Serra Carbonera
Serra d'Oliana
Serra del Tallat
Serra de Vilobí
Montmeneu
Serra de Matalescabres
Serra de la Fatarella
Serra dels Pesells

See also
Catalan Coastal Depression
Catalan Pre-Coastal Range

References

External links
Depressió Central 
Apunts sobre la Geologia de la Conca
Història geològica de Catalunya 
Banyeres del Penedès - Geologia 

Landforms of Catalonia
Valleys of Spain